Atabekians — Armenian Princely (Meliqly) house of Lords of the Jraberd principality (Meliqdom) in Artsakh, which ruled in the 19th century. The most renowned representative of this family was Prince Hovhannes (Vani) Atabekian, Prince of Jraberd, who took an active part in the Russo-Persian War (1804–13).

The Atabekians are descendants of Prince Ivane-Atabek I Hasan-Jalalian, son of Prince Hasan-Jalalian, the Lord of Khachen. His offspring, Prince Atabek III, settled in the north-eastern part of the paternal domain, along the banks of the Tartar and Kusapat rivers and there gave birth to a new dynasty. Therefore, the Atabekians consider themselves to be a dynastic branch of the House of Hasan-Jalalian, and through them trace their ancestry to the noble houses of the Vakhtangian, Aranshahik, Syuni, and the Haykazuni. DNA studies in 2009 also revealed kinship between the Atabekians and princes Argutian of Lori, Meliq-Yeganians of Dizak and Meliq-Dadians of Goris; all mentioned families belong to R1b1b2a haplogroup.

Princes of the House of Atabekian 
 Atabek I (mentioned in 1411, the fifth son of Prince Jalal III the Great Hasan-Jalalian)
 Aytin (mentioned in 1495)
 Sargis I
unknown lords
 Atabek II Jraberdci (1678)
 Hovhannes-Vani I and Ghuli
(the branch of Prince Vani I moved to Russia, Ghuli became the Houselord)
 Sargis II
 Harutyun (Tuni) (end of the 18th century)
 Hovhannes (Meliq Vani) II of Jraberd (1766 — 7 March 1854)
 Hovsep-bek (1815—1861)
(The family tree splits between Armenian provinces of Jraberd and Tavush)

Famous Atabekians 
 Meliq-Vani (Prince Hovhannes Atabekian, Lord of Jraberd)
 General Andrey Atabekov
  political figure Aleksander Atabekian
 Miqayel Atabekian, Minister of Education of Armenia (1918-1920)
 Academician Hovsep Atabekian
  Member of Russian Duma (Parliament) Hovsep Atabekian Sr.
 Professor and musician Angela Atabekian
 Engineer Prince Hrach Atabekian
 Engineer Suren Atabekian

The present-day state of the House of Atabekians 
Currently, the Princely House of Atabekians is one of the well-organized and active clans of Armenian nobility. The Atabekians regularly organise clan gatherings (tohmahavaq); the latest ones were held on 8 October 1983 in Meliqgyugh and on 19 April 2014 in Yerevan. The last clan gathering elected Prince Hrach Atabekian as the Head (tohmapet) of the House of Atabekians.

On 27 July 2012, the Atabekians were among the four aristocratic houses that initiated the restoration of the alliance of the traditional princely dynasties of the Armenian Artsakh, Melikdoms of Karabakh, by creating the Armenian Meliq Union:

See also 
 House of Hasan-Jalalyan

Literature 
 Potto, Vassili. The First Volunteers of Karabakh. Tiflis, 1902
 Raffi. "The Meliqdoms of Khamsa", Yerevan, 1991
 Maghalyan, Artak. "Meliqdoms and Meliqly Houses of Artsakh". Yerevan, 2007
 The Court Hearings of the Atabekians, "Archives of Armenia", 2008, # 1, pp. 3-27.
 "The Roots of the Tree", "Aniv", 08.09.2008 # 5 (14)
 Karapetyan, Armen. Critical Remarks regarding A.Maghalyan's "Meliqdoms and the Meliqly Houses of Artsakh". Historical-Philological Journal of the Armenian National Academy Of Science. 2009, # 1(243), p.246
 Archbishop Sergius Hasan-Jalaliants. A History of the Land of Artsakh. (Edited with an Introduction by Robert H. Hewsen). Costa Mesa 2013.

References

External links 
 Official website of the House of Atabekians

Armenian nobility